Melikşah, Çubuk is a village in the District of Çubuk, Ankara Province, Turkey.

History 
The name of the village comes from the Seljuk emperor Malik-Shah I who set up a pavilion on an ancient Roman bath.

The Battle of Ankara was fought on 20 July 1402 at these locations between the forces of the Ottoman Sultan Bayezid I and Timur, ruler of the Timurids.

Geography 
The village is 22 miles (~35 km) away from city of Ankara, 11 miles (~17 km) to Çubuk and 10 miles (~16 km) to Esenboga International Airport. The village is located in Ankara metropolitan area, therefore its official status is neighborhood.

Climate 
Continental climate is observed in the area.

Population

Infrastructure 
There is an elementary school in the village. The village has drinkable water and sewerage network.

Health services are provided by the clinic. The road connecting the village to the main roads are asphalt. There is also an olympic swimming pool, which was inactivated and abandoned in 2014.

References

Villages in Çubuk District